EuDaly is a surname. Notable people with the surname include:

Kevin EuDaly, American author and publisher
Sue EuDaly, character in Blue Jeans (1917 film)